The Department of Philosophy is an academic division in the Faculty of Arts and Humanities at King's College London. It is one of the largest and most distinguished centres for the study of philosophy in the United Kingdom.

History 
For over half a century since the Anglican foundation of King's College in 1829, the study of philosophy was restricted to courses within the Department of Theology and the Department of English Literature. In 1906 a separate Department of Philosophy and Psychology was explicitly established, and in 1912 Philosophy split to form its own department.

The department is located in the Philosophy Building on Surrey Street, a set of three adjacent townhouses joined through a series of corridors and forming part of the Strand Campus of King's College. The vaults along the back of the building are those containing the old Roman Baths on Strand Lane.

In 1989, Sir Richard Sorabji founded the King's College Centre for Philosophical Studies at the department with the aim of promoting philosophy to the wider public.

The Head of Department is currently Maria Alvarez Professor of Philosophy at King's.

Traditions 
The Department of Philosophy owns a historic bar on its premises in Surrey Street, officially the King's College Sports & Social Club Bar but referred to informally as simply the Philosophy Bar. Management of the bar was taken over by the King's College London Students' Union in 2016.

Academic staff and students of the department also make an annual trip to Cumberland Lodge, a Grade II listed country house in Windsor Great Park. There is a programme of lectures, communal meals and other activities, including an annual football match played between staff and students.

Student life in the department is administered mainly by the King's College London Philosophy Society.

Rankings 
The Department of Philosophy at King's ranks highly in both national and global rankings.

The Philosophical Gourmet Report lists the department at 4th in the UK and 26th in the English-speaking world.

QS World University Rankings places the department at 4th in the UK and 9th globally in 2021.

Current faculty

Emeritus faculty
Dov Gabbay, Augustus De Morgan Professor Emeritus of Logic
Raimond Gaita, Emeritus Professor of Moral Philosophy
 Jim Hopkins, Reader Emeritus in Philosophy
 Ruth Kempson, Emeritus Professor of Linguistics
 Shalom Lappin, Emeritus Professor of Computational Linguistics
Mary Margaret McCabe, Emeritus Professor of Ancient Philosophy
 Wilfried Meyer-Viol, Emeritus Lecturer in Computational Linguistics
 John Milton, Emeritus Professor of the History of Philosophy
David-Hillel Ruben, Emeritus Professor of Philosophy
 Anthony Savile, Emeritus Professor of Philosophy 
Gabriel Segal, Emeritus Professor of Philosophy
Sir Richard Sorabji CBE FBA FKC, Emeritus Professor of Philosophy and founder of the King's College Centre for Philosophical Studies
 Charles Travis, Emeritus Professor of Philosophy

Former faculty
Father Brian Evan Anthony Davies, former Tutorial Assistant
John Gardner FBA, former Reader in Legal Philosophy
Verity Harte, former Reader in Philosophy
Christopher Peacocke, former Susan Stebbing Professor of Philosophy
Sherrilyn Roush, former Peter Sowerby Chair in Philosophy and Medicine
R. Mark Sainsbury, former Susan Stebbing Professor of Philosophy
Roger Steare, former Reader in History of Western Philosophy
L. Susan Stebbing, former Lecturer in Philosophy
Peter Vardy, former Lecturer in Philosophy of Religion
Alexander Bird

Notable alumni

Peter Asher CBE, British musician, manager and record producer
Brian Evan Anthony Davies OP, British academic and philosopher
Sir David Tang KBE, Hong Kong journalist and businessperson
Hanif Kureishi CBE, British playwright, screenwriter, filmmaker and novelist
John Stammers, British writer and poet
Sir Ralph Wedgwood, 4th Baronet, British philosopher
Nicla Vassallo, Italian academic and philosopher
Alain de Botton FRSL, Swiss-British author and philosopher
Simon Saunders, British philosopher and physicist
Harry Brighouse, British academic and philosopher
Stefan Lorenz Sorgner, German academic and philosopher
Tariq Goddard, British novelist and publisher
Stathis Psillos, Greek academic and philosopher
Helen Beebee, British academic and philosopher

See also
UCL Department of Philosophy

References

External links
 Official Website

Departments of King's College London
Philosophy departments in the United Kingdom
1912 establishments in the United Kingdom